Trichodes creticus is a beetle species of checkered beetles belonging to the family Cleridae, subfamily Clerinae. It can is endemic to Crete.

References

creticus
Beetles described in 1982
Endemic fauna of Crete